Parnassos Ski Centre is a ski centre in Greece located at Mount Parnassus near Delphi. The ski centre is located at two main areas, Kelaria and Fterrolakas. It consists of 19 ski runs with a total length of 36 km with the longest being 4 km. The highest altitude of the resort is at 2,250m and the base is at 1,600m. The ski resort is 180 km from Athens and 205 km from Athens International Airport. Together with Kalavryta Ski Centre it is the ski centre that is closest to Athens.

The centre does not provide accommodation facilities. The nearest places to stay are Kalyvia, Arachova, Lilaia (or Kato Agoriani), Eptalofos (or Agoriani) and Amfikleia, located from 20 to 45 minutes drive from the centre. The centre provides equipment hire facilities as well as several restaurants and bars.

References

External links 
 Parnassos Ski Centre

Ski areas and resorts in Greece